Jungle Jim is a 1934–1954 American newspaper comic strip; the phrase may also refer to works adapted from the comic strip:

Jungle Jim (serial), a 1937 movie serial, starring Grant Withers
Jungle Jim (film), a 1948 film, followed by several sequels, starring Johnny Weissmuller
Jungle Jim (TV series), a syndicated series that premiered in 1955, also starring Weissmuller

Jungle Jim may also refer to:

People
People with the nickname include:
Jim Hunter (skier) (born 1953), Canadian alpine ski racer
Jim Liberman (1945–1977), American drag racer
Jim Loscutoff (1930–2015), American basketball player
Jim Rivera (1921–2017), American baseball player
Jim Steele (wrestler), professional wrestler

Other uses
1st Air Commando Group, originally the 4400th CCTS and Air Commandos, a unit of the U.S. Air Force nicknamed the "Jungle Jims"
Jungle Jim's International Market, a specialty supermarket in Fairfield, Ohio, U.S.

See also
Jungle gym, a piece of playground equipment